Union Club may refer to:

United Kingdom
 Union Club (Bristol), an 18th-century pro-Whig political club
 Union Club (London), a gentlemen's club in Trafalgar Square, 1827–1923

United States
 Union Club of Boston, Massachusetts
 Union Club of the City of New York
 Pacific-Union Club, in San Francisco, California
 Atherton Hotel at Oklahoma State University, originally the Union Club

Fictional
 Union Club, a club in short stories by Isaac Asimov, many in The Union Club Mysteries